Krystal Joy Brown (born in Alexandria, Virginia) is an American Broadway theatre, television and film actress best known for her portrayal of Eliza Hamilton in Hamilton on Broadway and her role as Renee Timmons on the Starz series, “Power Book III: Raising Kanan”. She also played of Diana Ross in the Broadway musical Motown: The Musical. She is a two-time Fred and Adele Astaire Award nominee for best female dancer in a Broadway show.

Career

Theatre
Brown made her acting debut in the national tour of the hit Broadway musical Rent, where she was cast as Mimi. She has appeared on Broadway in Hair, being cast in various roles; Leap of Faith, as Ornella Sturdevant; and Big Fish, as Josephine Bloom. Brown's theatrical productions outside of Broadway include the regional productions of
Little Shop of Horrors, High School Musical and Calvin Berger. She also appeared in the Off-Broadway show Falling for Eve. In 2014, she played Diana Ross in the Broadway production of Motown: The Musical. On December 10, 2019, she joined the cast of the Broadway blockbuster Hamilton as Eliza Hamilton

Television
In 2011, Brown made her first television appearance in the series Castle, as a character named Sasha, in the episode titled "Pretty Dead".

In 2016, Brown joined the cast of Hulu's Original TV series Deadbeat for the episode "AbraCadaver". She also guest-starred in a season 17 episode of Law & Order: Special Victims Unit.

In 2018-2020, Brown was the voice of Netossa in She-Ra and the Princesses of Power.

In 2019, Brown guest starred in the Sydney to the Max episode "How the Syd Stole Christmas" portraying Sydney Reynolds' late mother Dr. Alisha Reynolds in a flashback to four years ago.

In 2020-2022, Brown began a recurring role in the “CBS” series, “The Equalizer” opposite Queen Latifah. Brown recurs on season two of “Power Book III: Raising Kanan”.

Filmography

Film

Television

Theatre

References

External links

 (archive)

1986 births
Living people
American television actresses
American film actresses
African-American actresses
21st-century African-American people
21st-century African-American women
20th-century African-American people
20th-century African-American women